Harry Hubert Kaskey (September 15, 1901 – August 21, 1992) was an American speed skater who competed in the 1924 Winter Olympics.

He was born in Chicago and died in Sarasota, Florida.

In 1924 he finished seventh in the 1500 metres event, twelfth in the 500 metres competition, and 13th in the 10000 metres contest.

External links
 profile

1901 births
1992 deaths
American male speed skaters
Olympic speed skaters of the United States
Speed skaters at the 1924 Winter Olympics